Pheia elegans is a moth in the subfamily Arctiinae. It was described by Herbert Druce in 1884. It is found in Mexico, Guatemala, Panama, Costa Rica and Venezuela.

References

Moths described in 1884
elegans